Bow & Arrow is a growth consultancy and professional services company based in London, noted for having won the DBA Design Effectiveness Award for Service Design in 2015. The company was founded in 2009 by Natasha Chetiyawardana and Ben Slater under the name FH Innovation Ltd. In November 2011 the organisation was renamed to Bow & Arrow Ltd, and is currently based in Soho Square.

Former clients for Bow & Arrow include Google, Barclays and Carphone Warehouse, with tasks such as providing different processes and tools into many juxtaposing organisations. For example, introducing new technologies, developing new coaching skills or generating new ideas.

In 2015, Bow & Arrow was awarded bronze in the Service Design category at the DBA Design Effectiveness Awards for their design of Pin Point, "the UK's first tablet-based customer experience in a high street store".

See also

Accounting networks and associations
List of companies based in London
Professional services networks

References

External links

2009 establishments in England
Companies based in the City of Westminster
Consulting firms established in 2009
Management consulting firms of the United Kingdom